In Those Days is a 1947 German drama film directed by Helmut Käutner and starring Gert Schäfer, Erich Schellow and Winnie Markus. It was one of the cycle of Rubble films made in the wake of Germany's defeat during World War II. The film addresses issues of collective guilt during the Nazi era, using the device of a car built in 1933 and dismantled in 1947 narrating the various experiences of its owners in a series of seven separate episodes. The film's objective was to highlight the private resistance of various figures to the Nazis even while they publicly accepted the repression of Nazi society.

Production
The film was produced in Hamburg in the British Zone as part of a growing post-war trend in western Germany of moving film production away from its traditional centre of Berlin. The film was made under extremely difficult conditions including a lack of raw film stock and hunger amongst the cast and technicians. The director, Helmut Käutner, had several of his earlier films banned by the Nazis which led to him being perceived as possessing greater moral authority than many of his colleagues. Consequently, the film was seen as a standard-bearer for the values of the post-war German film industry.

Reception
It was well received by the German public in 1947 who were generally receptive to its message. In the 1960s the film began to attract criticism for allegedly whitewashing ordinary Germans' acceptance of Nazi ideology. However, this criticism has in turn been challenged as being ahistorical and ignoring the conditions under which it was made - such as the constraints put on German film-makers by the Allied occupation powers and the resistance of contemporary German audiences to films that explicitly examined their possible collective guilt.

Cast

References

External links

1947 drama films
German drama films
Films set in Hamburg
Films set in Berlin
Films directed by Helmut Käutner
Films about Nazi Germany
West German films
Films about automobiles
German black-and-white films
1940s German-language films
1940s German films